Alternative Press is an American entertainment magazine primarily focused on music and culture, now based in Los Angeles, CA. It generally provides readers with band interviews, photos, and relevant news. It was founded in 1985 by Mike Shea in Cleveland, OH. The company is now looked after by MDDN.

Beginnings
The first issue of Alternative Press was distributed at concerts in Cleveland, Ohio beginning in June 1985 by AP'''s founder, Mike Shea to advocate bands playing underground music.

The name for the magazine, Alternative Press, was not a reference to the alternative rock genre, but referred to the fanzine being an alternative to the local press.

Shea began working on his first issue in his mother's house in Aurora, Ohio. Shea and a friend, Jimmy Kosicki, targeted the Cleveland neighborhood of Coventry.

Financial problems plagued AP in its early years and by the end of 1986, publication had ceased due to its financial problems, not resuming until the spring of 1988.
==Growth in the 1990s==
With the growth of alternative rock in the early 1990s, circulation began to increase. Notable APs covers included bands such as Red Hot Chili Peppers and Soundgarden.

By 1994, the magazine was doing cover stories on Beastie Boys, Henry Rollins and Love and Rockets.

2000s

By the early 2000s, after resisting attempts to reform and design the so called "fanzine" Shea and Bobby Crist breathed new life into the publication and sought new revenues for its survival.  Revamping the magazine and marketing it in many venues. They shifted the focus of Alternative Press to the newer punk music associated with the Warped Tour. At the time of its 20th anniversary in 2005, AP had grown to an average size of 112 pages per issue, later averaging between 198 and 220-plus pages a month.AP sponsored a radio show aired on XM Radio, a podcast featuring in-depth discussions on various topics with people such as Fall Out Boy's Pete Wentz and Kevin Lyman, and a compilation CD.

Nearing the end of the 2000s AP would venturing into hosting tours with AP Tours, documenting musicians day-by-day on the publications YouTube channel, and working with large scale music events.

 2020s 
In the 2020s, both digital and print content shifted toward highlighting rising artists and introducing them to AP's audience. Cover stars include artists such as Waterparks, Rina Sawayama, Chase Atlantic, Willow Smith and more. The editorial shift expanded their coverage to more broader avenues that touched on lifestyle, culture, and style conversations within the alternative sphere. By 2022, the brand had formed new franchises to symbolise the shift in direction, such as Gen AP, and AP&R.

2022 saw Avril Lavigne debut on their March Issue, other notable cover stars that year included Demi Lovato, Louis Tomlinson, Spiritbox, and Arctic Monkeys. Upon the release of their Demi Lovato cover, the print publication announced it would be moving to quarterly releases, as opposed to its monthly roll-out, and also retiring monthly subscriptions.

Staff

 CEO 

 Julie Anne Quay

 Directors 

 Sam Coare, Managing Director
 Josh Madden, Creative Director

 Advertising and Business Development 

 Anthony Lauletta

Editorial
Ilana Kaplan, Senior Editor
 Neville Hardman, Content Editor
 Yasmine Summan, Social Media Manager
 Alessandro DeCaro, Artist Relations

Art/Production
 Rob Ortenzi, Lead Designer

The Alternative Press Music Awards

The Alternative Press Music Awards was an annual music awards show in the United States, founded by the music magazine Alternative Press''.

The inaugural awards show in 2014 was hosted by Mark Hoppus, bassist and vocalist of the pop-punk band Blink-182.

In 2015, the hosts were Alex Gaskarth and Jack Barakat of All Time Low.

In 2016, the show was hosted by Andy Biersack of Black Veil Brides.

As of 2022, another event has not been announced.

References

External links
 Official website
Online Shop
Instagram
Twitter
Facebook
TikTok

1985 establishments in Ohio
Magazines established in 1985
Magazines published in Cleveland
Monthly magazines published in the United States
Music magazines published in the United States